An Ether-a-go-go potassium channel is a Potassium channel which is Inwardly-rectifying and voltage-gated.

Examples include hERG, KCNH6, and KCNH7.

Potassium channels